The National Hockey League All-Star Skills Competition, officially the NHL All-Star Game SuperSkills Competition during certain past years, is an event on the night preceding the National Hockey League All-Star Game. Started at the 41st National Hockey League All-Star Game in Pittsburgh in 1990, the NHL uses the event to showcase the talents of its all-star participants. The All-Star teams select representatives for each event, with points awarded to the winning team.

Current events
Through 2023

Accuracy Shooting
The purpose of the event is to hit the four targets attached to the four corners of a goal in the fastest time. Prior to 2011, the object of the event was to hit all four targets in as few attempts as possible. Under this format, seven players have gone four-for-four: Ray Bourque in 1992 and 1993, Mark Messier in 1996, Jeremy Roenick in 2004, Tomas Kaberle in 2008, Evgeni Malkin in 2009, Daniel Sedin in 2011, plus Nazem Kadri, Brock Nelson and twice with Connor McDavid in 2023. Sedin is the current record holder, hitting 4/4 targets in 7.3 seconds. For the 2018 competition, the traditional foam targets were replaced with LED targets that light up to show the player where to shoot the puck next. During the 2019 Skills Competition, the LED light-up targets featured face emojis of four all-star NHL players. The 2020 competition introduced a fifth target in the center of the net, with the targets showing each player's name, team logo, All-Star Game logo, number of All-Star appearances by that player, and uniform number. The 2023 edition reverted to the four foam targets, but also introduced a knock-out style to the competition. As a result, while having the best time of the night, McDavid would ultimately be third in the competition, being beat by Kadri in the semi-finals.

Winners

#:Score in final round is listed

Breakaway Challenge
From the 2007–08 season onwards, the Breakaway Challenge format was changed to a "slam dunk" style challenge, where individual shooters showcase creative and skillful breakaways, with the winner being determined by fan voting via text messaging.

Winners

Fastest skater
The purpose of the event is to be fastest skater around a designated course within the rink. The final race each year was originally one full lap around the rink until 2008, when the event was revised to a course, only to be changed back to one full lap after 2015. In 2016, American-born Dylan Larkin finished with a time of 13.172, setting the record.

Winners

* - Player was part of the All-Star Rookies; participated in the Skills Competition, but not the All-Star Game.

Hardest Shot
The purpose of the event is to have the hardest shot. Martin Frk owns the record for the hardest shot in hockey with 109.2 mph during the 2020 AHL all-star competition. Prior to Chara the record was held by Al Iafrate at 105.2 mph. (The world record is  held by Denis Kulyash)

Al MacInnis holds the record for the most number of hardest shot wins at seven total (with an * on his speeds, as Al MacInnis always used a wooden stick, rather than the reinforced composite/foam that modern sticks are made out of, because he said he got more accuracy with a wooden stick. He likely would have had a faster shot using the more modern sticks).

Winners

Past Events
The following is a partial list of past events:

Breakaway Relay
The Breakaway Relay was held from 1991 to 2007. The purpose of the event is to use teamwork to score on a breakaway against an opposing goalie. Points are awarded to the team with the most goals and the individual goalie who lets in the fewest goals.

Winners

Elimination Shootout
The Elimination Shootout was held from 2008 to 2012. The purpose of the event is for individual scorers to try to score on a breakaway against an opposing goalie. Shooters who score stay alive in the contest while those failing to score are eliminated. The contest goes until all shooters are eliminated but one, with that shooter being the winner.

Winners

Elite Women's 3-on-3 Hockey

The Elite Women's 3-on-3 Hockey was held in 2020. Twenty of the best women's players in the world competed in a 20-minute, 3-on-3 game, with ten American All-Stars facing off against ten Canadian All-Stars.

There was two 10-minute periods with a running clock (except last minute of regulation and penalty shots). Teams switch ends after one period of play. Penalties will be "served" with penalty shot being awarded to the player fouled. And in the event of a tie, there will be a 3-minute sudden death overtime with a running clock to determine the winner. If tied after overtime, a sudden death shootout will occur.

Rosters

Team Canada

Forwards: Meghan Agosta, Melodie Daoust, Rebecca Johnston, Sarah Nurse, Marie-Philip Poulin, Natalie Spooner and Blayre Turnbull.

Defensemen: Renata Fast and Laura Fortino.

Goaltender: Ann-Renee Desbiens.

Coach: Jayna Hefford

Team USA

Forwards: Anne Pankowski, Alex Carpenter, Kendall Coyne Schofield, Brianna Decker, Amanda Kessel, Hilary Knight, Jocelyne Lamoureux-Davidson.

Defensemen: Kacey Bellamy and Lee Stecklein

Goaltender: Alex Rigsby Cavallini.

Coach: Cammi Granato

Winners

Four Line Challenge
The Four Line Challenge was held in 2017. The purpose of this event is for four skaters from each team to earn points by scoring goals from each line on the ice.
1st skater – two shots from near blue line. Goal in upper corners of the net = 1 point.
2nd skater – two shots from center ice. Goal in lower corners = 1 point. Goal in upper corners = 3 points.
3rd skater – two shots from far blue line. Goal in lower center corner ("five hole") = 1 point. Goal in upper corners = 5 points.
4th skater – two shots from far goal line. Goal in "five hole" = 10 points. If goalie scores = 20 points.

Winners

Goaltenders competition
The Goaltenders competition was held from 1990 to 2007. Points are awarded to the goalie allowing the fewest goals against in the Zone and Shootout/Breakaway Relay Events.

Winners

NHL Shooting Stars
The NHL Shooting Stars was held in 2020. It had players shooting from an elevated platform approximately 30 feet above the ice surface of the rink located in the seating bowl. Each Player shoots 7 pucks, scoring points for each target hit. (The arch target in center ice is 145 feet from the shooting platform). Players may hit the same target multiple times. In event of a tie, a sudden death "score-off" will occur.

Winners

NHL Shootout
The NHL Shootout was held from 2015 to 2017. The purpose of this event is for individual shooters to try to score on a breakaway against an opposing goalie. It is similar to the past event, Elimination Shootout; however, the shooter is not eliminated. The contest continues for three 2-minute rounds as six skaters from each team per round get a chance to score on the opposing team's goalie, gathering enough points until time runs out. Goals scored with game pucks equal 1 point, while Discover shootout pucks equal 2 points.

Winners

Passing Challenge/Premier Passer
The Passing Challenge made its debut in 2018, and was renamed Premier Passer in 2019. The purpose of this event is for skaters to earn points for their division by passing the puck to various targets, courses and nets in the fastest time possible. Note: Each skill must be completed before moving on to the next station.

Target Passing: each player must complete four successful passes to the targets that randomly light up.
Give and Go: each player must successfully complete the four required passes through the course.
Mini Nets: each player must complete a pass into each of the four mini nets and the game net.

Winners

Puck Control Relay
The Puck Control Relay was held from 1990 to 2019. The purpose of the event is to be fastest skater over the course while also maintaining control of the puck through a series of pylons. There are two races; the first where each team has three skaters in a race against each other and the second for the best individuals of each conference. One goal awarded to the winning team of each competition.

This event returned in 2018. Skaters from each division earn points on their skills with puck handling in the fastest time possible. Note: each skill must be completed before moving on to the next station.

Stick-handling: each skater must control the puck through a series of eight pucks.
Cone Control: each skater with a puck must skate through a series of eight cones.
Gates: as a skater approaches each gate, he must shoot the puck through the lit rung.

Winners

Save Streak
The Save Streak was held from 2018 to 2022. The purpose of this event is for goaltenders to earn points for their division by saving as many pucks as possible against an opposing division's shooter in NHL shootout fashion. The goaltender with the longest "save streak" and most saves wins the competition. Note: the winning goaltender receives $25,000.

Each scoring attempt is officiated in accordance with NHL shootout rules and begins on the referee's whistle.
Each goalie will face all players from an opposing division.
Players from each division will shoot numerically with the division captain shooting last.
If a goalie saves the divisional captain's shot, he will continue to face shooters until a goal is scored.
If there is a tie for the longest "save streak", the winner will be determined by the total number of saves made in their round.

Winners

Skills Challenge Relay
The Skills Challenge Relay was held from 2011 to 2017. This event had the following relays:
 One timers – three shooters must each score 2 goals from various locations in the offensive zone
 Passing – one passer must complete a pass into six small nets
 Puck Control Relay – one skater with the puck skates through a series of cones
 Stick Handling – one skater controls the puck through a series of pucks
 Accuracy Shooting – one shooter must hit four targets
 Goalie Goals - one goalie must score 2 goals
 
Two groups of each team participate: one-timers having left-hand shooters in one group and right-hand shooters in another.

Winners

Skills Conference winner
In 2009, there was no score kept.

In 2016, the winning conference was given the choice of whether to play the first or second mini-game in the All-Star Game the next day. In 2017, the winning division was given the choice of which opponent to play first in the All-Star Game.

In 2018, even though there were four divisions, the competition focused on individual player and no score was kept.

References

External links
The National Hockey League (NHL) All Star Game Superskills Competition
Results – 2008 SuperSkills Competition
Bruins' Chara breaks hardest shot mark
 1990–2009 Results

Recurring events established in 1990
SuperSkills Competition